Charles Rosenberg may refer to:

 Chuck Rosenberg (born 1960), former acting administrator of the Drug Enforcement Administration
 Charles E. Rosenberg (born 1936), American historian of medicine